20XX is an indie action platform video game developed by American indie studio Batterystaple Games. The early access version was released for Microsoft Windows on Steam on October 12, 2016. A sequel, 30XX, is available on Steam Early Access.

Gameplay 
Inspired by Mega Man X, players must defeat enemies and complete difficult platforming challenges to finish a stage. The twist is that these stages are generated randomly based on level segments, or "chunks", and allow for both local and online co-op. Rather than giving several lives, the game has permadeath, but is a "roguelite" in that the player can use Soul Chips earned during the level to unlock new types of passive upgrades to buy, and gain upgrades for the next attempt of that particular run.

During levels players can use bolts gained as currency to buy passive upgrades, or to gain back health or energy in vending machines. They can find upgrades in treasure chests and other places. Upon beating a boss the player can choose to take their power as a reward, granting them a new special ability, or take a reward of bolts or a random passive upgrade instead.

Plot 
The game follows Nina, an armored girl armed with a power blaster, and Ace, an armored boy who has an energy sword, in the aftermath of a robotic uprising.  Traveling from their base on the Ark, a space station orbiting the Earth, they have been hired to clear dangerous locations that are infested with robots that have run amok.

Development 
20XX began to be developed after a crowdfunding campaign on Kickstarter in the spring of 2014, when the game was called Echoes of Eridu. Following a successful Kickstarter, the game joined the Fire Hose Games accelerator program and appeared in the Indie Megabooth at Penny Arcade Expo 2015.

The game was the developer Chris King's first commercial game, and its development was prompted by the belief that it was his last chance to do such a risky thing as game development without a family to support, as he was in his late 20s. The idea behind the game was due to his belief that Capcom had ceased to make enough Mega Man titles, and that he and other fans desired more of the same type of gameplay.

The developer's main focus was on the game feel and getting it to play in a similar manner to Mega Man. The most difficult aspect in developing the game was debugging its netcode that allowed for online play.

Chris believes that Steam's Early Access program was essential to the development of the game, and "couldn't imagine" releasing it without it.

Soundtrack 
The game's soundtrack was composed by Brandon "Cityfires" Ellis and includes chiptune and synthesizer elements to make it resemble that of a Super NES game.

Reception 

20XX has been well received. Adam Smith of Rock, Paper, Shotgun commented that the game "looks fantastic."

See also
Mega Man X
Mighty No. 9

References

External links
 

2016 video games
Action video games
Early access video games
Kickstarter-funded video games
Nintendo Switch games
Platform games
PlayStation 4 games
Video games developed in the United States
Windows games
Xbox One games
Video games featuring female protagonists
Video games using procedural generation
Indie video games